Antea Cement Sh.A. is a cement manufacturing company in Albania.

It is a subsidiary of Titan Cement of Greece. Its cement plant and quarries in Fushë-Krujë  are expected to cost 170 million euros (USD233.3 million), according to Reuters.  The European Bank for Reconstruction and Development  is considering an investment in the project.

References

Cement companies of Albania
Albanian brands